Fernando Delgado (1891–1950) was a Spanish actor, screenwriter and film director. Delgado directed a mixture of documentary and feature films, including the 1936 bullfighting drama Currito of the Cross. His son Luis María Delgado was also a film director.

Selected filmography
 Currito of the Cross (1936)
 La gitanilla (1940)
 Fortunato (1942)

References

Bibliography 
 Labanyi, Jo & Pavlović, Tatjana. A Companion to Spanish Cinema. John Wiley & Sons, 2012.

External links 
 

1891 births
1950 deaths
Spanish film directors
Spanish male screenwriters
People from Madrid
20th-century Spanish screenwriters
20th-century Spanish male writers